Pietro Vidoni (8 November 1610 – 5 January 1681) was an Italian cardinal who served from 1652 to 1660 as the papal legate and nuncio to Poland.

Personal life

Vidoni was born 8 November 1610 in Cremona into Italian noble family. He studied at several Italian universities and received his doctorate, before moving to Rome and pursuing an ecclesiastical career.

Ecclesiastical service

During the pontificate of Pope Urban VIII, Vidoni was appointed as the governor of Rimini, Tivoli, Sabina, Orvieto and Spoleto

On 30 May 1652, Vidoni was appointed Apostolic Nuncio from Pope Innocent X to King John II Casimir Vasa of Poland., a position he held until his elevation to Cardinal in 1660. He was caught in the invasion of Poland by King Gustavus Adolfus of Sweden.

He conducted the holy mass in the Latin Cathedral of Lwów, during which Polish King John II Casimir had taken the Lwów Oath.

Cardinalate

Returning to Italy, he was elevated to cardinal by pope Alexander VII, in the consistory of 5 April 1660. In 1661 he was given the titular church of San Callisto. In 1662 he was a legate in Bologna.

In 1667 he participated in the papal conclave which elected Pope Clement IX. He also participated in the conclave of 1669-1670 which elected Pope Clement X and the conclave of 1676, which elected Pope Innocent XI.

Between 1675 and 1676 he served a term as the Camerlengo of the Sacred College of Cardinals.

Death and burial

He died in Rome on 5 January 1681 and was buried in the basilica of Santa Maria della Vittoria.

References

17th-century Italian cardinals
Apostolic Nuncios to Poland
Cardinals created by Pope Alexander VII
1610 births
1681 deaths
Clergy from Cremona